Artigueloutan is a commune in the Pyrénées-Atlantiques department in the Nouvelle-Aquitaine region of south-western France. It is part of the urban area (aire d'attraction des villes) of Pau.

The inhabitants of the commune are known as Artigueloutanais or Artigueloutanaises.

Geography
Artigueloutan is located some 11 km east by south-east of Pau and 9 km south of Morlaàs. Access to the commune is by the D817 from Pau in the west passing through the north of the commune and continuing to Soumoulou in the east. Access to the village is by the D215 road from Assat in the south-west passing through the village and continuing north to Andoins. The D213 comes from Ousse in the west passing through the village and continuing east to Nousty. The commune is entirely farmland.

The Idelis bus line has two stops in the commune: one on route P10 from Pau Auchan to Artigueloutan - Community Hall and the second is Demand responsive transport Flexis Zone Est.

The Ruisseau de l'Ousse passes through the centre of the commune from east to west and continues to join the Gave de Pau at Pau.

Places and Hamlets

 Artiguenave
 Belloc
 Bistarou
 Lou Bouey
 Casalet (two places)
 Cazenave
 Courège
 Courège (Mill)
 Fort de César
 Fréchou
 Haure
 Hourcade
 Humaraut
 Laclau
 Layus
 Lebon
 Les Mattots
 Miqueu
 Mounyoye
 Pont Long
 Poublan
 Rigabert
 Serresèque
 Tuquet

Neighbouring communes and villages

Toponymy
The name Artigueloutan appears in the forms:
Artigueloptaa (1385),
Artigalopta, and Artigelobtaa (14th century, Census of Béarn), 
Arthigueloutan (1457, Notaries of Assat), 
Artigaloutaa (1536, Titles of Affiefdom),
Artigalotaa (1675, Reformation of Béarn), 
'Artiguelotaa on the Cassini Map 1750,Cassini Map - Arugueloutaa  and Artigue-Loutan (1801, Bulletin des lois).

Its name in béarnais is Artigalotan (according to the classical norm of Occitan). According to Michel Grosclaude the name comes from the Gascon artigalota, meaning "small cleared land", with the suffix -anam.

A farm at a place called Belloc was mentioned in the Topographic Dictionary of 1863.Les Bordes, also called Viellelongue, was a hamlet in the commune in 1675, (Reformation of Béarn.Lou Bouey is an old hamlet in Artigueloutan which has been mentioned with the spellings: Lo Boey (1457, Cartulary of Ossau f. 177), and Louboey (1863).

Paul Raymond indicated that there was a Lay Abbey at Lou Bouey, dependent on the Viscounts of Béarn.Cambus, a farm in Artigueloutan, was also a fief which, in 1538, included the communes of Ousse and Rontignon, vassal of the Viscounts of Béarn.Clerguet was a farm and a fief of the commune, vassal of the Viscounts of Béarn, mentioned in 1538.

The Fort de César was a Motte-and-bailey castle in Artigueloutan and Ousse, mentioned in 1863.Rigabert is the name of a farm mentioned in the dictionary of 1863.

History
Paul Raymond noted that in 1385, Artigueloutan had 28 fires and depended on the bailiwick of Pau.

Administration

List of Successive Mayors

Inter-communality
The commune is part of seven inter-communal structures:
 the Communauté d'agglomération Pau Béarn Pyrénées;
 the AEP association of the Ousse Valley;
 the association for the management of the Drainage basin of the Ousse;
 the Energy association of Pyrénées-Atlantiques;
 the inter-communal association for sanitation for the communes of the Ousse plain;
 the inter-communal association for the construction of a rescue centre at Soumoulou;
 the inter-communal association for the construction and operation of the CES at Bizanos.

Demography
In 2017 the commune had 1,090 inhabitants.

Economy
The commune is partially part of the Appellation d'origine contrôlée (AOC) zone of Ossau-iraty

Culture and heritage

Sites and monuments

The Church of Saint John the Baptist dates to the middle of the 19th century. It is registered as a historical monument.

Environmental heritage
The Chemin Henri-IV'' passes along the south-western border of the commune.

Education
Artigueloutan has a primary school.

See also
Communes of the Pyrénées-Atlantiques department

References

Communes of Pyrénées-Atlantiques